Cherry Hill Mall is a unincorporated community and growing census-designated place (CDP) located in Cherry Hill, in Camden County, New Jersey, United States. As of the 2020 United States census, the CDP’s population was 14,805, its highest decennial count ever and an increase of 634 (+4.5%) from the 14,171 residents recorded at the 2010 census count, which in turn had reflected an increase of 933 (+7.0%) from the 13,238 counted at the 2000 census. The CDP is home to the namesake Cherry Hill Mall shopping complex.

Geography
According to the United States Census Bureau, Cherry Hill Mall had a total area of 3.646 square miles (9.443 km2), including 3.642 square miles (9.433 km2) of it is land and 0.004 square miles (0.009 km2) of water (0.10%).

Demographics

2010 census

2000 census
As of the 2000 United States census there were 13,238 people, 5,062 households, and 3,649 families residing in Cherry Hill Mall. The population density was 1,381.4/km2 (3,581.8/mi2). There were 5,219 housing units at an average density of 544.6/km2 (1,412.1/mi2). The racial makeup of the CDP was 83.15% White, 5.05% African American, 0.05% Native American, 9.03% Asian, 0.08% Pacific Islander, 1.10% from other races, and 1.54% from two or more races. Hispanic or Latino of any race were 3.01% of the population.

There were 5,062 households, out of which 29.6% had children under the age of 18 living with them, 59.3% were married couples living together, 9.6% had a female householder with no husband present, and 27.9% were non-families. 24.0% of all households were made up of individuals, and 12.5% had someone living alone who was 65 years of age or older. The average household size was 2.56 and the average family size was 3.05.

In Cherry Hill Mall the population was spread out, with 22.5% under the age of 18, 5.5% from 18 to 24, 26.1% from 25 to 44, 25.4% from 45 to 64, and 20.5% who were 65 years of age or older. The median age was 42 years. For every 100 females there were 89.1 males. For every 100 females age 18 and over, there were 85.6 males.

The median income for a household in Cherry Hill Mall was $61,620, and the median income for a family was $69,441. Males had a median income of $51,118 versus $34,355 for females. The per capita income for Cherry Hill Mall was $28,892. About 3.6% of families and 4.8% of the population were below the poverty line, including 5.9% of those under age 18 and 3.9% of those age 65 or over.

The District
The District is a commercially-oriented neighborhood within Cherry Hill Township comprising a high concentration of retail and dining entities, containing the Cherry Hill Mall CDP and adjacent commercial plazas, hotels, big box stores, dining amenities, and a large regional strip mall at the intersection of Route 70 and Haddonfield Road (County Route 644). The District is located in the vicinity of Route 38, Haddonfield Road, and Route 70, situated within 20 minutes of Center City, Philadelphia and Camden, New Jersey.

References

Census-designated places in Camden County, New Jersey
Neighborhoods in Cherry Hill, New Jersey